Newth is a surname. Notable people with the surname include: 

Brian Newth (born 1947), New Zealand modern pentathlete
David Newth (1921-1988), British zoologist
Eirik Newth (born 1964), Norwegian astrophysicist
George Samuel Newth (1851–1936), English chemist
Jonathan Newth (born 1939), British actor
Mette Newth (born 1942), Norwegian illustrator and author of children's literature
Philip Newth (born 1939), Anglo-Norwegian author of children's literature